This is a list of Navy Cross recipients for actions of valor carried out during World War II, awarded by the United States Department of the Navy.

World War II was a global military conflict, the joining of what had initially been two separate conflicts. The first began in Asia in July 1937 as the Second Sino-Japanese War; the other began in Europe in September 1939 with the German and Soviet invasion of Poland. This global conflict split the majority of the world's nations into two opposing military alliances: the Allies and the Axis powers.

The United States was drawn into World War II on December 8, 1941, a day after the Axis-member Japan launched a surprise attack on Pearl Harbor in Honolulu.

While the U.S. Department of Defense website of Military Awards for Valor states that "Army Air Corps/Army Air Forces/U.S. Air Force members recognized for actions prior to 1 July 1948 are listed as Army members", the list here attempts to give the specific detail for members of the Army Air Forces, which existed during World War II.

, this list is incomplete, showing 1,485 Navy Crosses awarded in all service branches for actions of valor during World War II: 489 to U.S. Navy recipients; 1,029 U.S. Marine Corps recipients; 11 U.S. Army Air Forces recipients; 6 U.S. Coast Guard recipients; 3 U.S. Army recipients; and 1 civilian recipient. By partial comparison, the U.S. Department of Defense shows 3,008 awarded to Navy recipients and 1,081 to Marines Corps recipients, for acts of valor during World War II.

A

B

C

D

E

F

G

H

I

J

K

L

M

N

O

P

Q

R

S

T

U

V

W

Y

Z

See also 
 List of Medal of Honor recipients for World War II
 List of Navy Cross recipients for the Korean War
 List of Navy Cross recipients for the Vietnam War

References

External links 
 
 Top 3 are: Medal of Honor; Distinguished Service Cross / Navy Cross / Air Force Cross; Silver Star
 this US DOD source only reports US Navy and US Marine Corps recipients of the Navy Cross
 
 this long standing private source believes it is "99.9% complete" for all military, civilian and allied recipients of the Top 2 (above Silver Star)

Navy Cross recipients